Thomas James Davey (30 March 1876 – 4 September 1907) was an Australian rules footballer who played with Melbourne in the Victorian Football League (VFL).

Notes

External links 

1876 births
Australian rules footballers from Victoria (Australia)
Melbourne Football Club players
1907 deaths